Lu Yen-hsun successfully defended his title by defeating Yūichi Sugita 6–3, 7–6(7–4) in the final.

Seeds

Draw

Finals

Top half

Bottom half

References
 Main Draw
 Qualifying Draw

Samsung Securities Cup - Singles
2012 Singles